In physics, the reciprocal lattice represents the Fourier transform of another lattice (group) (usually a Bravais lattice). In normal usage, the initial lattice (whose transform is represented by the reciprocal lattice) is a periodic spatial function in real space known as the direct lattice. While the direct lattice exists in real space and is commonly understood to be a physical lattice (such as the lattice of a crystal), the reciprocal lattice exists in the space of spatial frequencies known as reciprocal space or k space, where  refers to the wavevector. The reciprocal lattice of a reciprocal lattice is equivalent to the original direct lattice, because the defining equations are symmetrical with respect to the vectors in real and reciprocal space. Mathematically, direct and reciprocal lattice vectors represent covariant and contravariant vectors, respectively.

The reciprocal lattice is the set of all vectors , that are wavevectors of plane waves in the Fourier series of a spatial function whose periodicity is the same as that of a direct lattice .

The reciprocal lattice plays a fundamental role in most analytic studies of periodic structures, particularly in the theory of diffraction. In neutron, helium and X-ray diffraction, due to the Laue conditions, the momentum difference between incoming and diffracted X-rays of a crystal is a reciprocal lattice vector. The diffraction pattern of a crystal can be used to determine the reciprocal vectors of the lattice. Using this process, one can infer the atomic arrangement of a crystal.

The Brillouin zone is a Wigner-Seitz cell of the reciprocal lattice.

Wave-based description

Reciprocal space 
Reciprocal space (also called -space) provides a way to visualize the results of the Fourier transform of a spatial function. It is similar in role to the frequency domain arising from the Fourier transform of a time dependent function; reciprocal space is a space over which the Fourier transform of a spatial function is represented at spatial frequencies or wavevectors of plane waves of the Fourier transform. The domain of the spatial function itself is often referred to as real space. In physical applications, such as crystallography, both real and reciprocal space will often each be two or three dimensional. Whereas spatial dimensions of these two associated spaces will be the same, the spaces will differ in their units of length, so that when the real space has units of length L, its reciprocal space will have units of one divided by the length L so L−1 (the reciprocal of length).

Reciprocal space comes into play regarding waves, both classical and quantum mechanical. The spatial periodicity of this wave is defined by its wavelength , where ; hence the corresponding wavenumber in reciprocal space will be .

(The magnitude of a wavevector is called wavenumber.) The wavefronts with phases , where  represents any integer, comprise a set of parallel planes, equally spaced by the wavelength .

Reciprocal lattice 
In general, a geometric lattice is an infinite, regular array of vertices (points) in space, which can be modelled vectorially as a Bravais lattice. Some lattices may be skew, which means that their primary lines may not necessarily be at right angles. In reciprocal space, a reciprocal lattice is defined as the set of wavevectors  of plane waves in the Fourier series of any function  whose periodicity is compatible with that of an initial direct lattice in real space.

Its angular wavevector takes the form , where  is the unit vector perpendicular to these two adjacent wavefronts and the wavelength  must satisfy , means that  is equal to the distance between the two wavefronts.

(Although any wavevector  on the reciprocal lattice does always take this form, this derivation is motivational, rather than rigorous, because it has omitted the proof that no other possibilities exist.)

The Brillouin zone is a primitive cell (more specifically a Wigner-Seitz cell) of the reciprocal lattice, which plays an important role in solid state physics due to Bloch's theorem. In pure mathematics, the dual space of linear forms and the dual lattice provide more abstract generalizations of reciprocal space and the reciprocal lattice.

Mathematical description

Assuming a three-dimensional Bravais lattice and labelling each lattice vector (a vector indicating a lattice point) by the subscript  as 3-tuple of integers,

 where 

Taking a function  where  is a position vector from the origin  to any position, if  follows the periodicity of this lattice, e.g. the function describing the electronic density in an atomic crystal, it is useful to write  as a multi-dimensional Fourier series

where now the subscript , so this is a triple sum.

As  follows the periodicity of the lattice, translating  by any lattice vector  we get the same value, hence

Expressing the above instead in terms of their Fourier series we have

Because equality of two Fourier series implies equality of their coefficients, which only holds when

 where 

Mathematically, the reciprocal lattice is the set of all vectors , that are wavevectors of plane waves in the Fourier series of a spatial function whose periodicity is the same as that of a direct lattice as the set of all direct lattice point position vectors , and  satisfy this equality for all . Each plane wave in the Fourier series has the same phase (actually can be differed by a multiple of ) at all the lattice point .

As shown in the section multi-dimensional Fourier series,  can be chosen in the form of  where . With this form, the reciprocal lattice as the set of all wavevectors  for the Fourier series of a spatial function which periodicity follows , is itself a Bravais lattice as it is formed by integer combinations of its own primitive translation vectors , and the reciprocal of the reciprocal lattice is the original lattice, which reveals the Pontryagin duality of their respective vector spaces. Any valid form of  results in the same reciprocal lattice.)

Two dimensions
For an infinite two-dimensional lattice, defined by its primitive vectors , its reciprocal lattice can be determined by generating its two reciprocal primitive vectors, through the following formulae,

where  is an integer and

Here  represents a 90 degree rotation matrix, i.e. a quarter turn. Thus, using the permutation
 
we obtain

Notably, in a 3D space this 2D reciprocal lattice is an infinitely extended set of Bragg rods—described by Sung et al.

Three dimensions
For an infinite three-dimensional lattice , defined by its primitive vectors  and the subscript of integers , its reciprocal lattice  with the integer subscript  can be determined by generating its three reciprocal primitive vectors 

where  is the scalar triple product. The choice of these  is to satisfy  as the known condition (There may be other condition.) of primitive translation vectors for the reciprocal lattice derived in the heuristic approach above and the section multi-dimensional Fourier series. This choice also satisfies the requirement of the reciprocal lattice  mathematically derived above. Using column vector representation of (reciprocal) primitive vectors, the formulae above can be rewritten using matrix inversion:

This method appeals to the definition, and allows generalization to arbitrary dimensions. The cross product formula dominates introductory materials on crystallography.

The above definition is called the "physics" definition, as the factor of  comes naturally from the study of periodic structures. An essentially equivalent definition, the "crystallographer's" definition, comes from defining the reciprocal lattice . which changes the reciprocal primitive vectors to be

and so on for the other primitive vectors. This can simplify certain mathematical manipulations, and expresses reciprocal lattice dimensions in units of spatial frequency. It is a matter of taste which definition of the lattice is used, as long as the two are not mixed.

Each lattice point  in the reciprocal lattice corresponds to a set of lattice planes  in the real space lattice. (A lattice plane is a plane crossing lattice points.) The direction of the reciprocal lattice vector corresponds to the normal to the real space planes. The magnitude of the reciprocal lattice vector  is given in reciprocal length and is equal to the reciprocal of the interplanar spacing of the real space planes.

dimensions
The formula for  dimensions can be derived assuming an -dimensional real vector space  with a basis  and an inner product . The reciprocal lattice vectors are uniquely determined by the formula . Using the permutation
 
they can be determined with the following formula:

One can verify that this formula is equivalent to the known formulas for the two- and three-dimensional case by using the following facts: In three dimensions,  and in two dimensions, where  is the rotation by 90 degrees (just like the volume form, the angle assigned to a rotation depends on the choice of orientation).

Reciprocal lattices of various crystals 

Reciprocal lattices for the cubic crystal system are as follows.

Simple cubic lattice

The cubic lattice is therefore said to be self-dual, having the same symmetry in reciprocal space as in real space.

Face-centered cubic (FCC) lattice

Consider an FCC compound unit cell. Locate a primitive unit cell of the FCC; i.e., a unit cell with one lattice point. Now take one of the vertices of the primitive unit cell as the origin. Give the basis vectors of the real lattice. Then from the known formulae, you can calculate the basis vectors of the reciprocal lattice. These reciprocal lattice vectors of the FCC represent the basis vectors of a BCC real lattice. Note that the basis vectors of a real BCC lattice and the reciprocal lattice of an FCC resemble each other in direction but not in magnitude.

Body-centered cubic (BCC) lattice

Simple hexagonal lattice

The simple hexagonal lattice is therefore said to be self-dual, having the same symmetry in reciprocal space as in real space.

Arbitrary collection of atoms

One path to the reciprocal lattice of an arbitrary collection of atoms comes from the idea of scattered waves in the Fraunhofer (long-distance or lens back-focal-plane) limit as a Huygens-style sum of amplitudes from all points of scattering (in this case from each individual atom).  This sum is denoted by the complex amplitude  in the equation below, because it is also the Fourier transform (as a function of spatial frequency or reciprocal distance) of an effective scattering potential in direct space:

Here g = q/(2π) is the scattering vector q in crystallographer units, N is the number of atoms, fj[g] is the atomic scattering factor for atom j and scattering vector g, while rj is the vector position of atom j. Note that the Fourier phase depends on one's choice of coordinate origin.

when there are j=1,m atoms inside the unit cell whose fractional lattice indices are respectively {uj, vj, wj}. To consider effects due to finite crystal size, of course, a shape convolution for each point or the equation above for a finite lattice must be used instead.

Whether the array of atoms is finite or infinite, one can also imagine an "intensity reciprocal lattice" I[g], which relates to the amplitude lattice F via the usual relation I = F*F where F* is the complex conjugate of F. Since Fourier transformation is reversible, of course, this act of conversion to intensity tosses out "all except 2nd moment" (i.e. the phase) information.  For the case of an arbitrary collection of atoms, the intensity reciprocal lattice is therefore:

Here rjk is the vector separation between atom j and atom k. One can also use this to predict the effect of nano-crystallite shape, and subtle changes in beam orientation, on detected diffraction peaks even if in some directions the cluster is only one atom thick. On the down side, scattering calculations using the reciprocal lattice basically consider an incident plane wave. Thus after a first look at reciprocal lattice (kinematic scattering) effects, beam broadening and multiple scattering (i.e. dynamical) effects may be important to consider as well.

Generalization of a dual lattice

There are actually two versions in mathematics of the abstract dual lattice concept, for a given lattice L in a real vector space V, of finite dimension.

The first, which generalises directly the reciprocal lattice construction, uses Fourier analysis. It may be stated simply in terms of Pontryagin duality. The dual group V^ to V is again a real vector space, and its closed subgroup L^ dual to L turns out to be a lattice in V^. Therefore, L^ is the natural candidate for dual lattice, in a different vector space (of the same dimension).

The other aspect is seen in the presence of a quadratic form Q on V; if it is non-degenerate it allows an identification of the dual space V* of V with V. The relation of V* to V is not intrinsic; it depends on a choice of Haar measure (volume element) on V. But given an identification of the two, which is in any case well-defined up to a scalar, the presence of Q allows one to speak to the dual lattice to L while staying within V.

In mathematics, the dual lattice of a given lattice L in an abelian locally compact topological group G is the subgroup L∗ of the dual group of G consisting of all continuous characters that are equal to one at each point of L.

In discrete mathematics, a lattice is a locally discrete set of points described by all integral linear combinations of dim = n linearly independent vectors in Rn. The dual lattice is then defined by all points in the linear span of the original lattice (typically all of Rn) with the property that an integer results from the inner product with all elements of the original lattice. It follows that the dual of the dual lattice is the original lattice.

Furthermore, if we allow the matrix B to have columns as the linearly independent vectors that describe the lattice, then the matrix  has columns of vectors that describe the dual lattice.

See also
 Brillouin zone
 Crystallography
 Dual basis
 Ewald's sphere
 Kikuchi line
 Miller index
 Powder diffraction
 Zone axis

References

External links

 http://newton.umsl.edu/run//nano/known.html - Jmol-based electron diffraction simulator lets you explore the intersection between reciprocal lattice and Ewald sphere during tilt.
 DoITPoMS Teaching and Learning Package on Reciprocal Space and the Reciprocal Lattice
 Learn easily crystallography and how the reciprocal lattice explains the diffraction phenomenon, as shown in chapters 4 and 5

Crystallography
Fourier analysis
Lattice points
Neutron-related techniques
Synchrotron-related techniques
Diffraction
Condensed matter physics